The Co-operative Bank plc is a retail and commercial bank in the United Kingdom, with its headquarters in Balloon Street, Manchester. Established as a bank for co-operators and co-operatives following the principles of the Rochdale Pioneers the business evolved over the twentieth century into a mid sized British high street bank operating throughout the UK mainland. Transactions took place at cash desks in co-op stores until the 1960s, when the bank set up a small network of branches that grew from 6 to a high of 160. Branches for residents of the Isle of Man and the Channel Islands were closed in the 2010s during a significant rescaling exercise. Branches now number around 35.
 
The Co-operative Bank is the only UK high street bank with a customer-led Ethical Policy which is incorporated into the Bank's Articles of Association. The Ethical Policy was introduced in 1992 and incorporated into the Bank's constitution in 2013. The Ethical Policy was revised and expanded in 2015 in line with over 320,000 customer responses to a poll. The latest Values and Ethics report was published in May 2020.

The Bank does not provide banking services to organisations that conflict with customers’ views on a comprehensive range of issues, for example: human rights, environmental stability, international development and animal welfare, or those involved in irresponsible gambling or payday lending as stated in its ethical policy.

Despite its name, the bank has never been a cooperative itself. In the 1970s it was registered as a separate PLC that was wholly owned by the co-operative society it was part of, in order to achieve its status as a bank among other banks entitled to use inter-banking systems. That society,  The Co-operative Group, maintains some relationship with the bank today, including managing the licensed use of the brand name the "Co-operative ...." and maintained full and later partial ownership until 2017.

The bank was an early pioneer of branchless banking, allowing customers to use the telephone, and later the internet and mobile phones to access money, rather than visiting a physical branch. It introduced fee-less accounts – personal bank accounts without a monthly fee – now a mainstay of British banking, but unusual globally. It also campaigned against tar sands oil extraction, and accepted votes cast by women co-owner members some fifty years before wider women's suffrage in the U.K.

In 2013–14, after a merger with Leek based building society Britannia, a failed attempt to buy a larger rival and a troubled commercial property loan portfolio, the bank was the subject of a rescue plan to address a capital shortfall of about £1.9 billion. Representatives of the bank's then 12.6 million co-owners and management at the time dealt with a crisis by negotiating with creditors to exchange their claims on the bank's liabilities for equity in a debt-for-equity swap. The move reflected the fact that they could not be repaid with cash on hand, but provided them with ownership stakes in the bank, and therefore a share of any potential future profits. This avoided outright losses for the creditors, insolvency of the society and the collapse of the bank. 

This swap successfully reduced the bank's liabilities while increasing its ability to withstand the significant losses which had rapidly become apparent. It was a private transaction and thus avoided the part-nationalisations that befell larger rivals in UK, U.S.A and elsewhere in the 2008 Global Financial Crisis. The financial impact resulted in the bank's previous owners, private households across the UK, losing control of the bank, while US Hedge Funds funded the recapitalisation and absorbed the loss's equity.

The Co-operative Group, which had previously owned the bank outright, became a minority shareholder holding a 20% stake in the bank. Following restructuring and the formation of a new holding company on 1 September 2017, the Co-operative Group no longer owns a stake in the bank and the relationship agreement between the two organisations ended in 2020. The Customer Union for Ethical Banking have expressed their desire for the bank to return to co-operative ownership in the future.

The Bank is now a plc with debt securities listed on the London Stock Exchange. Its equity is not listed. The Bank's sole shareholder is the Co-operative Bank Finance plc. The sole shareholder of the Co-operative Bank Finance plc is the Co-operative Bank Holdings Ltd which is a private company limited by share capital. According to the Bank's 2019 accounts, the holding company is owned by hedge funds and other asset management companies.

History

Origins
The bank was formed in 1872 as the Loan and Deposit Department of the Co-operative Wholesale Society, becoming the CWS Bank four years later. However, the bank did not become a registered company until 1970. In 1975, the bank became the first new member of the Committee of London Clearing Banks for 40 years and thus able to issue its own cheques.

Expansion
In 1974 the Co-operative Bank offered free banking for personal customers who remained in credit. It was also the first clearing bank to offer an interest-bearing cheque account, in 1982.

The bank merged with the Britannia Building Society in 2009, increasing its branch network to 373 branches.
Following the UK Government's acquisition of 43.4% of Lloyds Banking Group in 2009, the Co-operative Bank entered into negotiations with Lloyds Banking Group to purchase over 600 of its branches. European Commission laws restricting state aid required the sale of the branches in a divestment known as Project Verde.

The purchase was publicly announced in July 2012 and it was revealed that the branches would be initially split from Lloyds under the resurrected TSB brand. On 24 April 2013 the Co-operative bank announced that it had decided against proceeding with the deal. The reasons given were the poor economic outlook in the UK and an increase in financial regulation requirements. The Financial Times had previously reported that the Co-operative would require a £1 billion increase in capital to support enlarging the bank.

2013 financial crisis

In March 2013 the bank reported losses of £600m. In May Moody's downgraded its credit rating by six notches to junk  (Ba3) resulting in the chief executive Barry Tootell's resignation.

Over the weekend of 15–16 June 2013 negotiations between the Co-operative Group and its regulator the  Prudential Regulation Authority culminated in reports  that the Bank had a shortfall in its capital of about £1.5 billion, and that this would be filled by a procedure known as a "bail-in" scheme. Bank Chairman Paul Flowers resigned shortly before the announcement of the shortfall. A press release by the bank issued on 17 June 2013 explained that the scheme would compel subordinated (also known as junior) bondholders to convert some or all of their assets from debt instruments to ownership ("equity") shares of uncertain value which would be listed on the London Stock Exchange and a new fixed income instrument. The scheme contrasted with the rescues of other British banks in 2008 and 2009 when central government introduced new capital into the failed institutions. Details of the outcome for small retail investors in the Bank were uncertain at the time of the June announcement, but there was no suggestion that ordinary deposits in the Bank would be put at any additional risk by the rescue, as they would continue to be covered by the existing compensation scheme. The bondholders had the opportunity to seek to reject the restructuring proposed, and an alternative option of the Bank of England taking over the ownership of the bank under the Banking Act 2009 special resolution regime was considered.

In September it was discovered that there was a £3.6bn funding gap between the value the Co-operative Bank placed on its loan portfolio and the actual value it would realise if forced to sell the assets. In October it was reported that the Co-operative Group had been forced to renegotiate the bank's £1.5bn rescue with US hedge funds Aurelius Capital Management, Beach Point Capital Management, and Silver Point Capital that owned its debt. As a result, the Group would lose majority control of its banking arm with the proportion of the bank's equity remaining under its ownership dropping to 30%, less than the 75% proposed in the original rescue plan. The plan passed a creditor vote and on 18 December 2013 a judge on the UK high court allowed the plan to move forward.

An independent review commissioned by the bank, published in April 2014, concluded that the root of the bank's problems lay in its 2009 takeover of the Britannia Building Society and poor management controls. The bank's auditors, KPMG, were fined £4 million for misconduct shortly after the takeover of Britannia, particularly the valuation of Britannia's commercial loans and other liabilities, by the Financial Reporting Council in 2019.

2014–16 rehabilitation 
The bank's chief executive at the time, Niall Booker, a former banker at HSBC who nursed HSBC's sub-prime lending business back to health, was appointed in 2013. He attempted to refocus the bank's strategy as a retail and SME lender. At this point, the Bank was Britain's seventh biggest lender, and the majority of the bank's revenue was made from interest charges on loans.

Flotation on the London Stock Exchange was planned for 2014 but the plans were abandoned in March 2014 when a rights issue was announced to raise an additional £400 million. In May 2014 the bank finalised the £400 million fundraising plan and obtained shareholder approval, which reduced the Co-operative Group's ownership of the bank to just over 20%.

The Co-operative Bank lost 38,000 current account customers in the first half of 2014 after suffering what it called a "hurricane of negative publicity" following the lender's near collapse. However, this loss was partly offset by 9,700 who switched to the bank – double the number who joined six months earlier, resulting in a net loss of 28,199 customers (around 2% of the bank's total). The rate of loss slowed significantly in 2015, resulting in a loss of 2,250 current account customers between January and August of that year. Overall, between 2014 and 2017, the number of current account holders dropped from 1.5 million to 1.4 million.

Nevertheless, the bank reported progress in its rehabilitation, as its losses sharply narrowed and it strengthened its capital position. Figures released by the bank in August 2014 for the first half of the year showed a pre-tax loss of £75.8 million was identified, compared to £844.6 million for the same period in 2013. Co-op Bank also said its core Tier 1 capital ratio, a key measure of financial strength, stood at 11.5 percent at the end of June and was expected to be significantly above the previous guidance of 10 percent at the end of 2014. However the bank, as expected, was unable to meet the new Bank of England financial stress tests in December 2014.

In late 2014 the bank sold its repossessed properties business for £157.5 million, and its ATM operating business for £35 million. It also outsourced its mortgage servicing operation to Capita, transferring about 660 staff to Capita.

The narrowing of losses was driven largely by a faster-than-expected reduction in unwanted assets, including significant parts of the portfolio of sub-prime mortgages the bank inherited from its merger with Britannia Building Society. Non-core assets reduced by £1bn, and credit impairments improved. In August 2014 the bank said it had cut staff numbers by 21 percent (about 1,560 workers) in the previous year and that there were more job losses to come. The bank had also closed 46 branches, reducing its branch network by 16 percent since the start of 2014. Another 25 would close in the remainder of the year, it said. In August 2015 the bank said that it had closed 62 branches over the previous year, taking the total down to 165. This was partly due to a 28% drop in in-branch transactions resulting from a change in demand from branch to internet banking. By that point staff reductions had exceeded 2000 workers. After the closure of 54 branches during the first three months of 2016 the bank described its programme of branch closures as "mostly finished". The total number of jobs cut by the bank between 2013 and 2017 was approximately 2,700. The closure of a further 10 branches in the spring of 2017 reduced the branch total to 95, down from nearly 300 at the start of the process.

In December 2014 a Bank of England assessment measured the bank's core capital ratio (a measure of financial strength) at minus 2.6%. As a result, the bank appointed Bank of America Merrill Lynch to help sell £6.6 billion of mortgages.

The bank was not expected to make a full-year profit until 2017 at the earliest. In August 2015 Booker said that he expected the bank would be "part of the consolidation of some of the country’s smaller banks", and that stock-market flotation would remain an option for the future. He said that there had been "no meaningful discussions" concerning the suggestion that the hedge funds which own 80% of the bank's equity were looking at buying up the Co-operative Group's remaining 20% holding.

On 1 April 2016 the bank announced a pre-tax loss for 2015 of £611m, more than double the loss of £264m for 2014. Booker's salary rose to £3.85m from its 2014 level of £3.1m, an increase of 24.2%. In November 2016 the bank announced a reduction of the workforce to 4,015, a loss of 200 staff.

2017 restructuring, investment and proposed sale 

In February 2017 the bank's board announced that they were "commencing a sale process" for the bank and were "inviting offers". They said that they were also considering options other than a sale to build capital, including raising cash from new and existing investors. A statement from the Co-operative Group indicated that it supported the decision. In April 2017 the Co-operative Group wrote off its 20% stake in the bank and in May 2017 the bank began seeking a debt-for-equity swap. In June 2017 the bank's board discontinued the formal sale process. By that time the bank's total losses since its financial crisis amounted to £2.6 billion. It was then announced that institutional bondholders had agreed to convert £426 million of bonds into equity, which would give them a 17 per cent stake in the bank. Additionally, it was announced that existing investors had agreed to put £250 million of new equity into a newly established holding company, which would take a 68 per cent stake in the bank. The investors also agreed to add £100 million over 10 years to the bank's pension fund and provide over £200 million of collateral to assist in separating the bank's pension from that of the Co-operative Group. The group was due to own 1 per cent of the bank, with the bank retaining its name and ethical policy. These arrangements were implemented in September 2017 and the final 1% stake held by the group was sold shortly afterwards for £5 million, ending the group's ownership of the bank entirely. The "relationship agreement" between the bank and the group is due to come to an end in 2020. During the uncertainty of the first half of 2017 the bank lost a further 25,000 current account customers. The bank reduced staff numbers by 800 in 2017 and made a pre-tax loss of £174.4 million (the loss for the previous year had been £477.1 million). In February 2018 the bank announced that its remaining branch network would be reduced from 95 to 68 branches during April and May 2018.

2018 onwards: extension of portfolio and growth 
Andrew Bester joined as the Bank's CEO in July 2017, setting out to deliver a plan to enhance the Bank's digital capabilities while developing the ethical brand further.

In September 2018 the bank expressed an interest in bidding for part of a £775 million fund designed to help banks develop their business banking services and encourage SME customers to transfer their accounts from RBS Group. The fund was created by RBS as a consequence of its £45 billion Government bailout during the financial crisis of 2007–2008. In May 2019, the Bank was awarded £15 million by Banking Competition Remedies (BCR) to grow its presence in the business banking market, following its successful application for funding from Pool B of the Capability and Innovation Fund.

During the first half of 2020 the bank allocated £11.2m to "loan impairments", giving a loss for that period of £44.6m. In August 2020 the closure was announced of 18 of the bank's remaining 68 branches – to take place by the end of the year – along with an 11% reduction in staff numbers, as a response to a reduction in branch use and historically low interest rates.

On October 6, 2020 it was announced that Andrew Bester had informed the Board of directors of his intention to step down as Chief Executive Officer and as a director of its parent company The Co-operative Bank Finance p.l.c. On October 20, 2020, it was announced that Nick Slape would be the CEO of The Co-operative Bank after stepping up from his role as CFO.

In November 2020, it was reported that the US private-equity firm Cerberus Capital Management had entered into talks with The Co-operative Bank regarding a takeover.

Membership before financial crisis
Despite its name, the Co-operative Bank was not itself a true co-operative as it was not owned directly by its staff, nor customers. Instead it was part-owned by a holding company which was itself a co-operative – the Co-operative Banking Group. Its customers could, however, choose to become Co-operative Group members and hence indirectly acquire an ownership interest in the bank, earning dividends on their account holdings and borrowing with the Bank.

The bank also had approximately 2,500 preference shareholders, which were irredeemable fixed-interest shares. These shareholders could attend the bank's general meetings, but only had speaking and voting rights if the dividend is in arrears, or on any resolution varying their rights or winding up the bank.

Unlike other co-operative banks, such as the Dutch company Rabobank, the Co-operative Bank did not have a federal structure of local banks, instead being a single national bank.

Customer Union for Ethical Banking
In October 2013, around the time of the takeover, a group of customers, supported by Ethical Consumer Magazine, launched a Save our Bank campaign, to keep the bank adhering to its ethical policy and eventually bring it back into cooperative ownership. 10,000 people signed up to the campaign. In 2016 the campaign became the Customer Union for Ethical Banking, a formal co-operative, which retained the Save our Bank name on its website. The union now has 1,200 members who all pay a small yearly membership fee. In 2019, the bank committed to ongoing engagement with the customer union, through a formal Recognition Agreement.

Ethical policy 

The Co-operative Bank operates an Ethical Policy and has an ethical code of conduct as part of its constitution. The Ethical Policy is overseen by a values and ethics committee chaired by an independent director. The Ethical Policy excludes the provision of any banking services to businesses that take part in certain business activities or sectors. These include a commitment not to finance "the manufacture or transfer of armaments to oppressive regimes" or "any business whose core activity contributes to global climate change, via the extraction or production of fossil fuels". The bank estimates that it has declined finance totalling in excess of £1bn since the policy was introduced in 1992. The Policy is based on a regularly renewed customer mandate in the form of a survey. In the 2005/06 financial year, whilst making profits of £96.5 million, it turned away business of nearly £10 million.

The Policy only applies to the balance sheet of The Co-operative Bank and never applied to other Co-operative Group businesses such as The Co-operative Asset Management, the Group's asset management business. Nevertheless, this business received criticism in 2009 for not following the Bank's Ethical Policy
and in 2013 it was sold to the Royal London Group.

In June 2005, the bank closed the account of a Christian evangelical group (Christian Voice) because of its standpoint on homosexuality, specifically the group's "discriminatory pronouncements on grounds of sexual orientation". They said the group was "incompatible with the position of the Co-operative Bank, which publicly supports diversity and dignity". Christian Voice said the bank was discriminating against it on religious grounds. Gay Times subsequently selected the Co-operative Bank for its Ethical Corporate Stance Award.

In late 2014 the bank undertook an advertising campaign to promote its Ethical Policy. The Co-operative Bank brand subsequently came top in YouGov's survey of the most improved brands of 2015.

The expanded Ethical Policy, updated in 2015, is built on five pillars: Banking, Workplace, Products and Services, Campaigning and Business.

Charity and community

The Bank's partnership with youth homelessness charity, Centrepoint, continued during 2018 and raised over £1m, helping to fund a national helpline for Centrepoint, and a specialist helpline service based in Manchester.

Support for new and developing co-operatives continued with investment of £1.3m over four years in The Hive, a co-operative business start-up consultancy service with Co-operatives UK.

In 2018, the Bank partnered with charity Refuge and successfully lobbied for the launch of a new banking industry code of practice for customers affected by financial abuse.

A brand campaign launched in 2018 positioned the Bank as ‘For People with Purpose’, its aim to restate their position as an organisation that "pioneers banking that makes a positive difference to the lives of our customers and communities".

As part of its Ethical Policy, the Bank has been working towards reaching environmental milestones over the last 30 years. As the "original ethical bank", the Co-operative Bank acts as an ambassador of the Climate and Ecological Emergency Bill campaign, led by the Zero Hour initiative.

Divisions

Smile

The bank launched a separate internet-only operation known as smile in 1999. It has around half a million customers. Smile had its call centre based at a unique pyramid building in Stockport.

Britannia

In October 2008, it was reported that Co-operative Financial Services was in talks with Britannia Building Society with a view to sharing facilities and possibly a full merger. Such a venture was facilitated by the passing of the Building Societies (Funding) and Mutual Societies (Transfers) Act 2007, although further secondary legislation was required before such a merger could take place. On 21 January 2009, Co-operative Financial Services and Britannia Building Society agreed to a merger, with the new "super-mutual" being brought under the stewardship of The Co-operative Group.  The proposed merger was subject to a vote by Britannia's members at their AGM at the end of April 2009. On 29 April 2009 Britannia's members voted overwhelmingly in favour of the merger.

In the short term, both Britannia Building Society and the Co-operative Bank continued operating their own products, branch networks and systems. All Britannia branches were due to be rebranded under the Co-operative name by the end of 2013, but this was abandoned in the wake of the financial crisis, with a great many simply closing and only a smaller number being retained and converted. In 2014 an independent review reported that the problems faced by both companies had been exacerbated by the merger.
In the same year the Deputy Governor of the Bank of England, Andrew Bailey, told the Treasury Select Committee that the Britannia Building Society would have collapsed if it had not been taken over by the Co-operative Bank.

Independent financial advice 
The Co-operative Bank withdrew its CIFA network in October 2011, and this was replaced by the Co-operative Banking Financial Planning Service, which is provided by AXA Wealth. AXA Wealth was also withdrawn, in April 2013. The Co-operative Bank has not replaced AXA Wealth.

Technical problems 
In 2009, the Co-operative Bank received considerable public criticism from business customers for problems with the bank's business internet banking service. It subsequently emerged that the service crashed when more than 130 users logged on simultaneously, and some business customers were left unable to access their accounts for days.

In 2011, some Co-operative Bank customers were left temporarily unable to use their debit cards as a result of IT problems.

Controversies
On 17 November 2013, Labour Party advisor and the former Co-operative Bank Chairman, Rev. Paul Flowers, was caught buying crack cocaine and methamphetamine. The former Labour councillor served as the Bank's chairman from April 2010 until June 2013 and it was under his chairmanship that in March 2013 the bank reported losses of £600 million. In May, Moody's downgraded its credit rating by six notches to junk (Ba3) and the chief executive Barry Tootell resigned. Flowers was suspended by both the Labour Party and the Methodist Church. On 19 November it was discovered that Flowers had previously resigned as a Labour Party Councillor for Bradford Council after "inappropriate" content was discovered on his computer.

On 19 November 2013, the group's Chairman Len Wardle, who was leading the board when Flowers was appointed to his position, resigned "with immediate effect" because of the Flowers scandal.

In June 2021, the Bank said that from then on customers would not be allowed to make online payments unless they owned a mobile phone and also gave the number to the bank: "To use your card online, you will now need to have a UK mobile number registered with us."

See also

The Co-operative Credit Union
Co-operative Permanent Building Society
Customer Union for Ethical Banking

References

Further reading

External links 
 
 The Kelly Review
 Customer reviews

Banks of the United Kingdom
Cooperative banking in Europe
Companies based in Manchester
Banks established in 1872
Ethical banking
Bank
Supermarket banks